The 1962 United States Senate election in Connecticut was held on November 6, 1962. 

Incumbent Senator Prescott Bush retired instead of seeking a second full term in office. Former Governor of Connecticut and United States Secretary of Health, Education, and Welfare Abraham Ribicoff was elected his successor over Congressman Horace Seely-Brown, Jr. Ribicoff had previously sought election to this seat in 1952 but lost to Bush.

Republican nomination

Candidates

Declared
 Horace Seely-Brown, Jr., U.S. Representative from Connecticut's 2nd congressional district

Withdrew
 John Davis Lodge, former Governor of Connecticut and United States Ambassador to Spain (following loss at convention)
 Antoni Sadlak, U.S. Representative from Connecticut's at-large congressional district (to manage the Seely-Brown campaign)

Results
Congressman Horace Seely-Brown, Jr. won an upset victory over former Governor John Davis Lodge at the Republican state convention. After two weeks of deliberation, Lodge opted not to seek a primary challenge and Seely-Brown was unopposed for the Republican nomination on the primary ballot.

Democratic convention

Candidates

Declared
 Abraham Ribicoff, United States Secretary of Health, Education, and Welfare and former Governor of Connecticut

Eliminated at convention
 Frank Kowalski, U.S. Representative for Connecticut's at-large congressional district

Convention results
Kowalski fell short of the 190 delegates needed to be eligible for a primary election. Ribicoff was unopposed on the primary ballot.

General election

Results

See also 
 1962 United States Senate elections

References 

1962
Connecticut
United States Senate